Atlantic station is an at grade light rail station on the L Line of the Los Angeles Metro Rail system. It is located at the intersection of Atlantic and Pomona Boulevards in East Los Angeles.

This station opened on November 15, 2009, as part of the Gold Line Eastside Extension and currently serves as the southeastern terminus of the L Line. The station is expected to be relocated to accommodate service for the Eastside Transit Corridor Phase 2 by 2035. This station and all the other Eastside Extension stations will be part of the E Line upon completion of the Regional Connector Transit Project in 2023.

A 268-space parking structure for this station opened on April 22, 2010, joining a 21-space parking lot.

Service

Station layout 
Atlantic station utilizes a simple island platform setup with two tracks in the median of East 3rd Street. There are two ramps for platform access, one at the intersection of South Atlantic Boulevard, leading to the station's park and ride garage, and the other at the junction of East Beverly Boulevard and South Woods Avenue.

Hours and frequency

Connections 
, the following connections are available:
 Los Angeles Metro Bus: , 
 El Sol: City Terrace/ELAC, Whittier Blvd/Saybrook Park
 Montebello Bus Lines: 10, 40, 90

References 

L Line (Los Angeles Metro) stations
Eastside Los Angeles
Railway stations in the United States opened in 2009
2009 establishments in California